Dyschirius hoberlandti is a species of ground beetle in the subfamily Scaritinae. It was described by Kult in 1954.

References

hoberlandti
Beetles described in 1954